Totally R&B is an album in the Totally Hits music compilation series.  Released in 2003, the compilation focuses on mostly R&B singles that were released in the early 2000s.  Unlike its Totally Hits counterparts which mainly focus on Top 40/pop hits, Totally R&B and Totally Hip Hop are the only two compilations focused on urban music acts.

Totally R&B contains the Billboard Hot 100 number-one single, "U Got It Bad", which is also the only number-one R&B hit on the compilation.

Track listing
Tyrese – "How You Gonna Act Like That"  3:54
Usher – "U Got It Bad"  4:08
R. Kelly – "Ignition"  3:42
Brandy – "Full Moon"  3:59
Alicia Keys – "A Woman's Worth"  4:20
Jaheim – "Put That Woman First"  4:04
Nivea – "Laundromat"  3:34
Erick Sermon – "Music"  3:43
Monica – "All Eyez On Me"  3:58
Luther Vandross – "I'd Rather"  4:51
Donell Jones – "You Know That I Love You"  4:19
Joe – "What If a Woman"  4:15
Syleena Johnson – "Guess What"  3:31
Angie Stone – "Brotha"  3:59
Kenny Lattimore and Chante Moore – "Things That Lovers Do"  3:52
Jimmy Cozier – "She's All I Got"  3:32
Whitney Houston – "One of Those Days"  3:53
Craig David – "Hidden Agenda (Soulshock & Karlin Remix)"  3:46
Toni Braxton – "A Better Man"  3:58
Gerald Levert – "Closure"  4:09

References

Totally Hits
2003 compilation albums
Rhythm and blues compilation albums